The pontocerebellar fibers are the second order neuron fibers of the corticopontocerebellar tracts that cross to the other side of the pons and run within the middle cerebellar peduncles, from the pons to the contralateral cerebellum.

The term "corticopontocerebellar" is the entire pathway from the cerebral cortex to the contralateral cerebellum.

References

External links
 https://web.archive.org/web/20130330093937/http://www.neuroanatomy.wisc.edu/virtualbrain/BrainStem/16Pontine.html
 https://web.archive.org/web/20080221222726/http://isc.temple.edu/neuroanatomy/lab/atlas/pmjdc/
 http://www.sylvius.com/index/p/pontocerebellar_fibers.html

Pons
Cerebellar connections
Central nervous system pathways